Bradley Ian Robinson (born March 14, 1975) is a former Zimbabwean cricketer who played for the Mashonaland cricket team from 1995 to 2000. He is a sports physiotherapist.

Robinson was born in Salisbury in what was then Rhodesia in 1975. He is the son of former Test cricket umpire Ian Robinson. He played in 10 first-class cricket matches for Mashonaland and for a Zimbabwe Board XI as a wicket-keeper. He represented Zimbabwe Young Cricketers and Zimbabwe Schools and played one List A cricket match for Zimbabwe A in the 1997/98 Standard Bank Cup. After graduating from the University of Zimbabwe in 1998 and qualifying as a physiotherapist, Robinson worked with the Zimbabwe national cricket team from 2000 to 2004.

In 2005 he left Zimbabwe and moved to England where he worked in private practice in Kent, working with Kent County Cricket Club at the St Lawrence Clinic based at the St Lawrence Ground at Canterbury from 2006. Between 2014 and 2016 he worked with the Pakistan team.

References

External links
 

1975 births
Living people
Zimbabwean cricketers
Sportspeople from Harare
Mashonaland cricketers
Zimbabwean emigrants to the United Kingdom
Zimbabwean expatriates in Pakistan
Wicket-keepers